Rustam Boqiev (born 21 January 1978) is a Tajikistani judoka. He competed in the men's extra-lightweight event at the 1996 Summer Olympics.

References

External links

1978 births
Living people
Tajikistani male judoka
Olympic judoka of Tajikistan
Judoka at the 1996 Summer Olympics
Place of birth missing (living people)
Judoka at the 1998 Asian Games
Judoka at the 2006 Asian Games
Asian Games competitors for Tajikistan
People from Districts of Republican Subordination
21st-century Tajikistani people
20th-century Tajikistani people